3C 191 is a quasar located in the constellation Cancer.

References

Quasars
191
2817585
Cancer (constellation)